The Southwest Iberian Margin (SIM) is an active tectonic zone along and offshore of the coast of Portugal.  It is believed to be an incipient subduction zone and the source of the great  Lisbon earthquake of 1755.

See also
 Geology of the Iberian Peninsula

References

Iberian Peninsula
Geology of Portugal
Geology of Spain
Geology of the Atlantic Ocean